Otis Mensah is an alternative hip-hop and spoken word artist, and former Poet Laureate of Sheffield, UK.

Career
Mensah has described his work as a means of challenging dominant models of masculinity, which he claims suppress the discussion of emotions, with negative consequences for mental health.

As a hip-hop artist, Mensah has performed at the BBC Music Introducing Stage at Glastonbury Festival. His lyrics combine playful imagery and unconventional symbolism, often accompanied by boom bap instrumentals.

In November 2018, Magid Magid, the Lord Mayor of Sheffield, appointed Mensah as Poet Laureate of Sheffield. Mensah stated that he wishes to use the position to "break down barriers" and change "elitism attached to poetry."

Discography
 Days Over Damson EP (2015)
 Blancmange Lounge Sessions (2017)
 Mum's House, Philosopher EP (2018)

References

External links

English spoken word artists
English male rappers
Year of birth missing (living people)
Living people